Danny Jin-Myung Lee (born 24 July 1990) is a New Zealand professional golfer. Lee was born in Incheon, South Korea, and emigrated to New Zealand at the age of eight. He became a New Zealand citizen on 2 September 2008 at Rotorua, where he attended Rotorua Boys' High School.

Amateur career
Lee became the youngest ever winner of the U.S. Amateur in August 2008, aged 18 years and one month, six months younger than Tiger Woods when he won in 1994. His age record was broken the following year by 17-year-old An Byeong-hun. He became number one in the World Amateur Golf Ranking on 20 August 2008 and remained number one until he turned pro in April 2009. He was awarded the 2008 Mark H. McCormack Medal on 27 August.

In October 2008, Lee represented New Zealand at the Eisenhower Trophy in Adelaide, Australia. A final round 11-over 84 saw him finish T37 in the individual standings. The New Zealand team finished tied for 11th.

In February 2009, Lee won the Johnnie Walker Classic in Perth, Australia, a professional tournament co-sanctioned by the European, Asian, and Australasian tours. He was the youngest ever winner on the European Tour, surpassing Dale Hayes, and only the second amateur winner after Pablo Martín. The win took him to 159th place in the Official World Golf Ranking.

Lee's first major was the 2009 Masters Tournament, where his first round two-over 74 put him in a position to make the cut. In the second round he eagled the par-5 eighth and played the front nine in 34, but a six-putt led to quintuple bogey on the 10th, dropping him to five-over for the tournament. He was unable to recover, eventually finishing 11-over par.

Professional career

2009: Bid for PGA Tour status falls short
Lee turned professional after the 2009 Masters Tournament, forfeiting his guaranteed entry into the 2009 U.S. Open and the 2009 British Open as the 2008 U.S. Amateur champion.

In April, Lee signed a two-year endorsement contract with Callaway Golf, to use Callaway clubs, balls, and signage on his clothes. The company has not released how much his contract is worth, but sources say it is for US$1 million per year.

Lee was allowed to use seven sponsor exemptions during the PGA Tour season, and gained three other starts courtesy of his U.S. Amateur and Johnnie Walker Classic titles. His goal was to earn $537,958 which would have given him temporary membership and allowed him to receive an unlimited amount of invitations. That figure is the amount earned by the player who finished 150th on the 2008 money list.

Lee made six out of eleven PGA Tour cuts after turning pro, with two top-25 finishes. He tied for 13th at the HP Byron Nelson Championship in May, and improved on his best finish in a PGA Tour event by finishing in a tie for 7th at the AT&T National in July. That top ten finish earned Lee a spot in the following week's John Deere Classic, meaning he did not have to use one of his two remaining sponsor exemptions. The money from his T-7 finish put him $187,904 away from earning temporary status on tour. Lee missed the cut by two strokes at the John Deere Classic after bogeying the last two holes of his second round. Lee missed the cut again three weeks later at the Buick Open.

In August, Lee became the youngest player to play in a World Golf Championship event when he played the WGC-Bridgestone Invitational. He finished T51 at the event. He made the cut but did not finish at the Wyndham Championship two weeks later. He used his last sponsor exemption of the season to play in that tournament and did not earn enough money on tour to earn his card for 2010.

Lee then switched his focus to the European Tour, as well as playing selected events in Asia. He made his maiden appearance as a professional in Europe at the Johnnie Walker Championship at Gleneagles where he finished T10. As a drawcard for the Korea Open and the Coca-Cola Tokai Classic in Japan, he played the first two rounds of both events with fellow teen prodigy Ryo Ishikawa.

Lee entered the PGA Tour's qualifying school at the first stage level, beginning his campaign in McKinney, Texas on 20 October. Needing to finish in roughly the top third of the field, rounds of 72-78-69-76 saw him fall well short of advancing to the second stage.

After arriving back in Asia for the Singapore Open, Lee cited swing changes, illness and cold weather as reasons for his disappointing performance in Texas, and confirmed an intention to play mainly on the European Tour in 2010. He also announced he had signed Korean-born Suckki Jang, an affiliate of Hank Haney, as his new coach. He then played the WGC-HSBC Champions, the Hong Kong Open, and represented New Zealand with David Smail at the Omega Mission Hills World Cup, all with limited success.

2010
Lee made a poor start to the 2010 season, making just two cuts in his first nine events on the European Tour.

On the eve of the BMW PGA Championship in May, Lee announced a new partnership with English caddy Peter Coleman. "I finally feel that I am in the right position with my swing and that has got me really excited," Lee said.

However, after receiving a sponsor's invite to play the RBC Canadian Open in July, Lee stated he was now without a swing coach. He added that he had been through several coaches since turning professional and had perhaps become too technical with his mechanics, and was now trying to focus more on playing than tweaking his swing.

Lee eventually finished the Race to Dubai in 159th place, making 10 out of 20 cuts with a best finish of T21 at the BMW International Open in June.

Late in the year, he successfully negotiated the first two stages of PGA Tour qualifying school in California. At the final stage in Florida, Lee shot rounds of 74-72-69-65-72-74 to finish T64. His placing earned him full Nationwide Tour playing rights, allowing him to plan a 35-event, two-tour itinerary for 2011.

2011
Lee began a noticeable return to form a couple of months into the new year. A tie for 7th in the Chitimacha Louisiana Open was followed by a strong showing for 54 holes at the Malaysian Open, eventually being disqualified for signing an incorrect final round scorecard (denying him a tie for 17th). The next week he tied for 2nd at the Volvo China Open, four shots behind winner Nicolas Colsaerts.

In May, a tie for 5th in the Stadion Classic at UGA was followed by an outright third at the BMW Charity Pro-Am.

In June he injured his left wrist during an Open Championship qualifier, forcing his withdrawal and a four-week break from competition. Diagnosed as tendonitis, he worked with his caddy in American events, Jeff Belen, on grip and swing adjustments. By early September he had posted three further Nationwide Tour top-10 finishes, including a tie for 2nd at the Cox Classic.

In early October Lee won the WNB Golf Classic in Texas, beating Harris English in a playoff. The $94,500 first prize lifted him to 4th on the money list, assuring him of a place inside the final money list's top 25, those being the players who gain PGA Tour cards for the following season.

"It feels great to win again," Lee said. "I haven't won a tournament since I won the 2009 Johnnie Walker Classic and it's a great feeling. It's not easy to win and I worked really hard with my uncle and my coach (Bill Choung) for this. I'm really happy it worked." Lee credited the switch to a belly putter in this event as beneficial, and came after pulling out of the previous week's event after 27 holes citing his wrist injury.

Lee finished sixth on tour with earnings of $326,100, making 13 of 18 cuts with nine top-10s. He had the season's lowest scoring average of 68.98.

2012
Lee entered the new season with PGA Tour and European Tour cards. He said he was still keen to play a two-tour schedule, however his main focus would be on America. He made only 13 cuts in 26 events on the PGA Tour and lost his tour card. He did not play on the European Tour.

After striking up a successful partnership late in the Nationwide Tour season, Lee said he would have Australian Graeme Courts, a former long-time caddy of Loren Roberts, working for him on the PGA Tour.

K. J. Choi introduced Lee to another Australian, Steve Bann, as a potential coach. "I am close with K.J. Choi and he said I was thinking too much about my swing," Lee said. "I was always working on something and I am too technical sometimes so K.J. introduced me to Steve. Steve is a simple guy who is teaching me how to practise with better routine and how to trust my own game and not think too much.

2013
Lee played on the Web.com Tour in 2013, finishing 15th on the regular season money list to regain his PGA Tour card for 2014. His best finish was second at the Rex Hospital Open.

2014
On the back of six straight missed cuts, Lee adopted a claw putting grip for the Puerto Rico Open in March. He credited the change of putting style for yielding him an instant result; a runner-up finish, two shots behind winner Chesson Hadley.

2015
In the 2015 PGA Tour fall season, Lee finished third at the OHL Classic at Mayakoba. In the spring, he finished seventh at the Valspar Championship and tenth at the Crowne Plaza Invitational at Colonial. He won his first PGA Tour event in July at the Greenbrier Classic. The next week he finished fourth at the John Deere Classic. In August he finished fourth at the Quicken Loans National and sixth at the WGC-Bridgestone Invitational. With a runner-up finish at the Tour Championship, he finished 9th in the FedEx Cup standings.

2019
In the 2019 PGA Championship, Lee announced he was now working with golf coach George Gankas which was netting him a significant increase in length off his tee shots; especially his driver. He opened with a 64 (−6) and was only one off Brooks Koepka's lead. He then followed with scores of 74, 71, and 77 to finish tied for 36th.

2020
At the 2020 U.S. Open, Lee made the 36 hole cut, but later withdrew from the championship after the third round citing a wrist injury; he had earlier taken six putts from close range on the final hole.

2021
Lee played using Parsons Xtreme Golf equipment during the 2021 season following his departure from TaylorMade.

2023
Following his appearance at the Genesis Invitational on the PGA Tour in February, Lee joined LIV Golf ahead of its second season.

Amateur wins
2007 South Island Amateur (New Zealand), New Zealand Amateur
2008 Lake Macquarie Amateur, North Island Amateur (New Zealand), Western Amateur, U.S. Amateur
2009 Georgia Cup

Professional wins (4)

PGA Tour wins (1)

PGA Tour playoff record (1–0)

European Tour wins (1)

1Co-sanctioned by the Asian Tour and the PGA Tour of Australasia

Nationwide Tour wins (1)

Nationwide Tour playoff record (1–0)

LIV Golf League wins (1)

LIV Golf League playoff record (1–0)

Results in major championships
Results not in chronological order in 2020.

CUT = missed the half-way cut
"T" indicates a tie for a place
WD = withdrew
NT = No tournament due to COVID-19 pandemic

Summary

Most consecutive cuts made – 3 (twice)
Longest streak of top-10s – 0

Results in The Players Championship

CUT = missed the halfway cut
"T" indicates a tie for a place
WD = withdrew
C = Cancelled after the first round due to the COVID-19 pandemic

Results in World Golf Championships
Results not in chronological order before 2015.

QF, R16, R32, R64 = Round in which player lost in match play
"T" = tied

PGA Tour and European Tour career summary

* Complete as of 20 February 2023. 
† Lee was not ranked because he was not a member.

Team appearances
Amateur
Nomura Cup (representing New Zealand): 2007
Eisenhower Trophy (representing New Zealand): 2008
Bonallack Trophy (representing Asia/Pacific): 2008
Sloan Morpeth Trophy (representing New Zealand): 2007 (winners), 2008

Professional
World Cup (representing New Zealand): 2009, 2016
Presidents Cup (representing the International team): 2015

Personal life
Lee married Yoomi Kong in 2017. Together they have two children, Roi and Robin.

See also
2011 Nationwide Tour graduates
2013 Web.com Tour Finals graduates

References

External links

South Korean male golfers
New Zealand male golfers
European Tour golfers
PGA Tour golfers
Olympic golfers of New Zealand
Golfers at the 2016 Summer Olympics
Golfers from Texas
Korn Ferry Tour graduates
People educated at Rotorua Boys' High School
New Zealand people of Korean descent
People with acquired New Zealand citizenship
South Korean emigrants to New Zealand
Sportspeople from Rotorua
Sportspeople from Incheon
People from Irving, Texas
1990 births
Living people